Andrew Harper (13 November 1844 – 25 November 1936) was a Scottish–Australian biblical scholar, teacher, school principal and University College Principal.

Early life
Harper was born at 167 Main Street, in the Gorbals in Glasgow, Scotland, son of Robert Harper, a grocer, and his wife Elizabeth, née Calderwood. After some preliminary education at The Glasgow Academy, he moved to Australia and enrolled at the Scotch College, Melbourne.

Harper joined the civil service, and in 1864 passed the matriculation examination of the University of Melbourne and graduated BA in 1868. Harper then studied at the University of Edinburgh, where he graduated BD in 1872 and gained the Cunningham fellowship.

Career
On Harper's return to Australia from Edinburgh, he was assistant at Chalmers' Church, East Melbourne from September 1873–1875. He did not pursue the ministry at this point as his doctrinal views were liberal evangelical and were not openly accepted at that time. He was appointed English master at the Presbyterian Ladies' College, Melbourne, in 1875, becoming headmaster in 1877, and in 1879, Principal. Harper resigned at the end of 1888, leaving the school with a high reputation among the secondary schools of Victoria. 

Also in 1888, Harper was appointed lecturer of Hebrew and Old Testament Exegesis at Ormond College within the University of Melbourne. He was ordained and appointed Professor in 1893. He was editor of The Messenger of the Presbyterian Church of Victoria in 1895–1902, and carried it on with much ability. In 1902 he took up the appointment as Hunter-Baillie professor of Hebrew and Principal of St Andrew's College at the University of Sydney, and was Chairman of the Presbyterian Ladies' College, Sydney Council from 1907 until 1913.

Retirement and death
Harper was a good speaker and debater who exercised much influence in the Presbyterian Church of Australia, and more especially on the candidates for the ministry who studied under him. He had decided convictions but could realise the difficulties of others. Personally he was modest and thoroughly sincere, loyal to the Christian faith yet believing in scientific inquiry, a wise and understanding mentor at a period of transition and reshaping, when many beliefs once firmly held were being attacked.

Harper resigned the office of Principal of St Andrew's College in 1921, and the professorship in May 1924, being then in his eightieth year. He retired to Edinburgh where he died on 25 November 1936, twelve days after his 92nd birthday.

He is buried in the 20th century extension to Dean Cemetery accessed off Queensferry Road in western Edinburgh. His wife Barbara lies with him along with two daughters: Elizabeth Beatrice Harper (1877–1957) and Agnes Ethel Harper (1880–1965).

Family

Harper married twice: firstly to Agnes Marion Craig (died 1885) on 23 October 1875 and secondly to Barbara Harriet Rainy (1860–1947), daughter of Dr Robert Rainy, Principal of New College, Edinburgh, where Harper had studied for his divinity degree. She survived him with two sons and five daughters. His and Barbara's daughter Margaret Hilda Harper became a noted physician.

Publications
Harper was a fine scholar but did not publish a great deal. The Book of Deuteronomy in the Expositer's Bible series, published in 1895, gave him a good reputation, as it was widely recognised as a work of great value. He also contributed a volume, The Song of Solomon to The Cambridge Bible for Schools and Colleges in 1902. His The Hon. James Balfour M.L.C., a Memoir, is an interesting record of a leading Melbourne merchant and politician whom Harper had known for nearly 50 years. A series of lectures to the Sydney University Christian Union was published under the title Christian Essentials; he printed a few pamphlets, and he also contributed the chapter on "The White Australia Policy" to Australia, Economic and Political Studies, edited by Meredith Atkinson and published in 1920.

Legacy
Portraits of Harper are held at the Presbyterian Ladies' College, Melbourne and the Presbyterian Ladies' College, Sydney. His contribution to P.L.C Sydney is also recognised in the schools house system, with Harper House. St Andrew's College at the University of Sydney features the Harper building named after him.

See also
List of Australian Presbyterians
Notable Aberdonians

References

Presbyterian Ministers in Australia 1822–1901: Biographical Register by Rowland Ward & Malcolm Prentis (Melbourne 1901)

1844 births
1936 deaths
People educated at the Glasgow Academy
Alumni of the University of Edinburgh
Australian educators
Australian Presbyterians
Australian people of Scottish descent
Presbyterian Church of Australia
People educated at Scotch College, Melbourne